AJS Review, published on behalf of the Association for Jewish Studies, publishes scholarly articles and book reviews covering the field of Jewish Studies. From biblical and rabbinic textual and historical studies to modern history, social sciences, the arts, and literature, the journal welcomes articles of interest to both academic and lay audiences around the world. A substantial portion of each volume is devoted to reviews of the latest scholarly Judaica and to review essays on current trends in publishing.

Currently the AJS review is published by Cambridge University Press. It is edited by Alyssa Gray and James Loeffler.

References

External links
 Official website of the Association for Jewish Studies
 AJS Review homepage at University of Pennsylvania Publishing

Judaic studies journals
Cambridge University Press academic journals
Academic journals associated with learned and professional societies